Rincón del Gato is a village and municipality in Entre Ríos Province in north-eastern Argentina. It was not considered a location in 1991 and 2001 census, and its population was of 60 inhabitants in 2001.

References

Populated places in Entre Ríos Province